Čierna Lehota may refer to several places in Slovakia.

Čierna Lehota, Bánovce nad Bebravou District
Čierna Lehota, Rožňava District